This is a list of notable people from Madawaska County, New Brunswick, Canada. Although not everyone in this list was born in Madawaska County, they all live or have lived in Madawaska County and have had significant connections to the communities.

This article does not include people from Edmundston as they have their own section.

See also
List of people from New Brunswick

References

Madawaska